Hadley is a non-profit serving adults with vision loss offering practical help, connection, and new ways to approach everyday tasks made more difficult with changing vision.  

Workshops, Call-in Discussion Groups, and the Hadley Presents Podcast explore topics of daily living, adjusting to vision loss, tech tools useful for those with vision loss, learning braille, and adaptive techniques for recreation and working with a visual impairment.

Hadley's help comes in many forms – online, on the phone, and through the mail. 
Hadley is a partner of the National Eye Institute (NEI) and the National Eye Health Education Program (NEHEP).

History

Background
Hadley was founded in 1920 by William A. Hadley.
When he lost his sight at the age of 55, William Hadley faced many challenges. A former high school teacher with a lifelong passion for reading, Hadley wanted to learn braille. He was frustrated, however, in his search for a teacher. So, he taught himself braille instead.

Founding
Hadley's dream was to share his newfound skills with others like him, empowering them to thrive as much as he. Together with Dr. E.V.L. Brown, an ophthalmologist and neighbor, Hadley found a way to reach others from around the corner and across the globe.
The Hadley Correspondence School and the "braille by mail" curriculum were launched in 1920. The very first student, a woman in Kansas, had lost her sight later in life, too, and she was desperate to continue reading. She mailed her lessons to Hadley. He corrected and returned them along with notes of help and encouragement. This was the beginning of the close instructor-learner relationship that is a hallmark of Hadley learning even today.  
Dr. Brown was also critical to the founding and success of Hadley. He worked to build and manage an organization that could sustain itself while offering education free of charge. In 1922, Dr. Brown was appointed to be Hadley's first President of the Board of Trustees and would serve in this role until his death in 1953.

Emerging Technology
By the early 1960s, Hadley was exploring new approaches to distance learning, producing plastic braille books and audio recordings all from its building in downtown Winnetka, for distribution to a growing population of visually impaired across the country. In the ensuing decades, Hadley added film and video production to its array of media channels to enhance the learning experience.

Hadley Today
In July 2020, Hadley launched its new online learning platform, Hadley.edu. Built on many months of research and development addressing the needs of visually impaired older adults, the learning hub offers free how-to short workshops on a variety of practical topics. Workshops are delivered online or through the mail in audio or print. Hadley's call-in discussion groups offer live support from experts and a chance to connect and learn from peers. Hadley's popular podcast Hadley Presents: A Conversation with the Experts offers listeners extraordinary access to top names in their fields.

Notable Faculty and Leadership
 Richard Kinney
 Geraldine Lawhorn
 Dr. E.V.L. Brown

References

External links
 

Distance Education Accreditation Commission
Winnetka, Illinois
Schools for the blind in the United States